Leon "Lefty" Stewart (1915 – 1969) was an American baseball pitcher in the Negro leagues. He played with the Newark Eagles in 1936 and 1940. He later played with the Negro American League Birmingham Black Barons in 1942 as outfielder. Leon adopted the nickname "lefty", because he batted right and pitched left.

Leon "Lefty" Stewart was the son of Merida and Minnie Stewart.  He later married Ms Fannie Paxton.  They had three children, one son Mr. Leon Stewart Jr., and two daughters, Miss Vera and Miss Joyce Stewart.

References

External links
 and Seamheads

Newark Eagles players
1915 births
1969 deaths
Baseball players from Norfolk, Virginia
Baseball pitchers
20th-century African-American sportspeople